Marianne Noack (later Paulick, born 5 October 1951) is a retired German gymnast. She competed at the 1968 Summer Olympics in all artistic gymnastics events and won a bronze medal in the team competition. Her best individual result was tenth place on the balance beam. She also won a silver medal with the East German team at the 1970 World Artistic Gymnastics Championships.

References

External links

1951 births
Living people
German female artistic gymnasts
Sportspeople from Rostock
Olympic gymnasts of East Germany
Gymnasts at the 1968 Summer Olympics
Olympic bronze medalists for East Germany
Olympic medalists in gymnastics
Medalists at the 1968 Summer Olympics
Medalists at the World Artistic Gymnastics Championships